Antonio Benedetti may refer to

 Antonio Benedetti (Bishop of Guardialfiera) (died 1552)
 Antonio Benedetti (1715–1788),  Italian scholar